The Wrong Doyle is a mystery crime novel by Robert Girardi.

Plot summary
Tim Doyle returns to the Eastern Shore of Virginia after the death of his Uncle Buck.  He meets the keeper of Uncle Buck's inheritance, Maggie Peach.

References

2002 American novels
American mystery novels
Novels set in Virginia
Eastern Shore of Virginia
Sceptre (imprint) books